Timothy Robert Morabito (born October 12, 1973) is a former professional American football player who played defensive tackle for five seasons for the Cincinnati Bengals, Carolina Panthers, and Jacksonville Jaguars.

1973 births
Living people
People from Garnerville, New York
Players of American football from New York (state)
American football defensive tackles
Boston College Eagles football players
Cincinnati Bengals players
Carolina Panthers players
Jacksonville Jaguars players